The Command may refer to:

"The Command" (short story) a 1938 short story by L. Sprague de Camp
The Command (comic) part of the series Fifty State Initiative, a fictional governmental plan that appears in comic books published by Marvel Comics
The Command (1954 film) a cavalry Western starring Guy Madison
The Command (2005 film)
The Command, the US release title of Kursk (film), a 2018 submarine disaster film

See also
Command (disambiguation)